Sir Edmund Taylor Whittaker was a British mathematician, physicist, historian of science, and philosopher who authored three titles that remain in circulation over a century after their initial publications. His bibliography includes several books and over one hundred published papers on a variety of subjects, including mathematics, astronomy, mathematical physics, theoretical physics, philosophy, and theism. Whittaker's bibliography in the Biographical Memoirs of Fellows of the Royal Society categorises his publications into three categories: books and monographs, maths and physics articles, and biographical articles; the bibliography excludes works published in popular magazines like Scientific American. The bibliography includes eleven total books and monographs, fifty-six maths and physics articles, thirty-five philosophy and history articles, and twenty-one biographical articles. In the bibliography compiled by William Hunter McCrea in 1957, there are thirteen books and monographs and the same journal articles; McCrea counts all three volumes of A History of the Theories of Aether and Electricity as separate books and excludes the same papers. Whittaker's contributions to Scientific American include two book reviews and a popular article on mathematics.

John Lighton Synge reviewed ten of Whittaker's papers when he wrote about Whittaker's contributions to electromagnetism and general relativity. Among other tributes as part of the same memorial volume of the Proceedings of the Edinburgh Mathematical Society, George Frederick James Temple wrote about Whittaker's work on harmonic functions, and Alexander Aitken wrote about Whittaker's work on algebra and numerical analysis. Whittaker also published several biographical articles, including one for Albert Einstein written just a few months before his death.

Books

Whittaker wrote three scientific treatises that were highly influential in their fields, A Course of Modern Analysis, Analytical Dynamics of Particles and Rigid Bodies, and The Calculus of Observations. In 1956, Gerald James Whitrow stated that two of these books, Modern Analysis and Analytical Dynamics, were not only required reading for British mathematicians but were regarded as fundamental components of their personal libraries. Despite the success of these textbooks, the second edition of A History of the Theories of Aether and Electricity has been called Whittaker's magnum opus. Due to the title's popularity, William Hunter McCrea predicted that future readers would have a hard time acknowledging it was the result of just "a few years at both ends of a career of the highest distinction in other pursuits." Whittaker also wrote The theory of optical instruments during his time as Royal Astronomer of Ireland and wrote several other books on various subjects throughout his career.

Whittaker & Watson

Whittaker was the original author of the textbook A Course of Modern Analysis, first published in 1902. The book was reviewed by George Ballard Mathews, Arthur Stafford Hathaway, and Maxime Bôcher, among others. The book's later editions were written in collaboration with Whittaker's former student George Neville Watson, resulting in the textbook taking the famous colloquial name Whittaker & Watson, published in 1915, 1920, and 1927. Reviewers of the book's later editions include Philip Jourdain, Eric Harold Neville, and Dorothy Maud Wrinch. The book is subtitled an introduction to the general theory of infinite processes and of analytic functions; with an account of the principal transcendental functions and is a classic textbook in mathematical analysis.

Analytical Dynamics of Particles and Rigid Bodies

Whittaker's second major work, A Treatise on the Analytical Dynamics of Particles and Rigid Bodies, was first published in 1904 and quickly became a classic textbook in its subject. The book went through four editions, published in 1917, 1927, and 1937. It has remained in circulation for over a hundred years. The book represented the forefront of development at the time of publication; many reviewers noted it contained material otherwise non-existent in the English language. The book has received acclaim from sources other than book reviews as well, including physicist Victor Lenzen, who said in 1952 that the book was "still the best exposition of the subject on the highest possible level". One hundred and ten years after its initial publication, a 2014 "biography" of the book's development noted that the book remained influential as more than a "historical document".

A History of the Theories of Aether and Electricity, From the Age of Descartes to the Close of the Nineteenth Century

Whittaker's third major work, A History of the Theories of Aether and Electricity, From the Age of Descartes to the Close of the Nineteenth Century, was published in 1910. The book gives a detailed account of the history of electromagnetism and aether theories from René Descartes to Hendrik Lorentz and Albert Einstein, including the contributions of Hermann Minkowski and a chapter each devoted to Michael Faraday and James Clerk Maxwell. The book was well received and is an authoritative reference work in the history of physics; the title established Whittaker as a respected historian of science. Pending the release of a second edition, the book remained out of print for many years, though it is now free to be reprinted in the United States, as it qualifies as public domain. Dover Publications released a reprint of the book in 1989. Along with several others, Edwin Bidwell Wilson reviewed the treatise in 1913.

The Calculus of Observations or A Short Course in Interpolation
Whittaker's fourth major work, The Calculus of Observations a Treatise on Numerical Analysis, coauthored with George Robinson, was a pioneering textbook in numerical analysis that was originally published in 1923 and provides an introduction to methods of practical computation. The first four chapters, on interpolation, were published separately under A Short Course in Interpolation, in 1924. The book went through four total editions, with the fourth in 1944. The book received positive reviews upon its initial release. It was reviewed by William Fleetwood Sheppard, Lewis Fry Richardson, and Jack Howlett, among others. Several of the book's reviewers found that it was advanced and intended mostly for mathematicians. Some reviewers also noted that the book was the first to be devoted fully to the subject in the English language. Forty-three years after its initial publication, Jack Howlett reviewed a reprint of the fourth edition by Dover Publications in 1969 in a comparison of the book with two newer works. He wrote that "one can hardly call it a modern book" and noted that the book had changed relatively little since its original print in 1924 and from the lectures that Whittaker delivered at the Edinburgh Mathematical Laboratory between 1913 and 1923. He went on to remark that there are only a few useful chapters in the book concerning the calculus of finite differences and its applications, including interpolation and difference formulae, but that the rest of the book seemed "completely outmoded".

Philosophy of Arthur Eddington

Sir Arthur Stanley Eddington, one of Whittaker's former students, held philosophical views similar to Whittaker's. At the end of his career, Whittaker was influenced by the philosophical ideas Eddington had advocated for and, in addition to editing the latter's Fundamental Theory, he published several articles and books exploring the topic. Whittaker's presentation at the 1947 Tarner Lecture was published as From Euclid to Eddington by the Cambridge University Press and his other book on the topic, Eddington's principle in the philosophy of science, was published two years later.

Fundamental Theory
Whittaker edited Arthur Eddington's Fundamental Theory, which was published posthumously in 1946 by the Cambridge University Press. Eddington died in November 1944 and Whittaker was given the task of editing and publishing the book, which was nearly complete. 
The book received several reviews and responses, including a review by William Hunter McCrea and Clive W. Kilmister. Kilmister later wrote a book on the topic, titled Eddington's search for a fundamental theory, which was published by Cambridge University Press in 1994, and was itself reviewed by David Kaiser, among others.

From Euclid to Eddington : A study of the conceptions of the external world
Whittaker's philosophy book From Euclid to Eddington : A study of the conceptions of the external world was published in 1949 by the Cambridge University Press. The book is a published lecture originating from the 1947 Tarner Lecture at Trinity College, Cambridge. The volume recounts the history of the theories of natural philosophy beginning with Euclid and stretching to Eddington, including the philosophical ideas of Plato, Aristotle, and Einstein. The original edition of the book received reviews from Peter Bergmann, Edward Arthur Milne, and Israel Monroe Levitt. A 1960 reprint of the book by Dover Publications has also received reviews.

Eddington's principle in the philosophy of science
Whittaker spoke at the annual Arthur Stanley Eddington Memorial Lecture in 1952, which was subsequently published by American Scientist and Cambridge University Press. In the book's preface, Whittaker articulates Eddington's principle as "all the quantitative propositions of physics… may be deduced by logical reasoning from qualitative assertions". One reviewer noted some caveats to the interpretation and stated that Eddington would not necessarily have been satisfied with this wording. The work expounded on the principle, traced its development to Gottfried Leibniz, discussed its mathematical basis, and addresses potential objections. Whittaker also describes Eddington's views on universal constants. and discusses their connection to the philosophy of religion. William Hunter McCrea and Thomas Cowling reviewed the work in 1952.

A History of the Theories of Aether and Electricity extended and revised edition

Whittaker published an extended and revised edition of his Theories of Aether in two volumes, with volume one in 1951 and the second in 1953. Notwithstanding a notorious controversy on Whitaker's views on the history of special relativity, covered in volume two of the second edition, the books are considered authoritative references on the history of classical electromagnetism as well as classic books in the history of physics. The first volume, subtitled the classical theories, serves as a revised and updated edition of the original 1910 book. Among others, Arthur Mannering Tyndall, Carl Eckart, Victor Lenzen, William Hunter McCrea, Julius Sumner Miller, John Lighton Synge, and Stephen Toulmin reviewed the book. The second volume extended this work covering the years 1900 to 1926, including the early development of special relativity, general relativity, old quantum theory, and quantum mechanics. Among others, Max Born, Freeman Dyson, Rolf Hagedorn, and Percy Williams Bridgman reviewed the book. Whittaker's role in the relativity priority dispute centres on chapter two of the second volume, where he claims that Lorentz and Poincare had developed the theory of relativity before Einstein. Due to the controversy this sparked, the second volume is cited far less than the first volume and first edition, except in connection with the priority dispute.

Other books and monographs

Articles
Whittaker wrote many maths, physics, and astronomy articles over his career in addition to many others in subjects like history, philosophy, and theism. He also wrote several popular articles in magazines such as Scientific American as well as several book reviews. Whittaker wrote over twenty biographical articles and obituaries throughout his life, including one for Albert Einstein just a few months before his own death. John Lighton Synge reviewed ten of Whittaker's papers when he wrote about Whittaker's contributions to electromagnetism and general relativity. Among other tributes as part of the same memorial volume of the Proceedings of the Edinburgh Mathematical Society, George Frederick James Temple wrote about Whittaker's work on harmonic functions, and Alexander Aitken wrote about his work on algebra and numerical analysis.

Maths and science

Philosophy and history

Biographical

Book reviews

Popular articles

See also

 Bibliography of Max Born
 List of scientific publications by Albert Einstein
 List of important publications in mathematics
 List of important publications in physics
 List of textbooks on classical mechanics and quantum mechanics

Publications

References

Further reading
 
 
 
 
 
 
 
 
 
 

Whittaker
 
Whittaker
E. T. Whittaker